Henri Crolla (born Enrico Crolla; 26 February 1920 – 17 October 1960) was an Italian jazz guitarist and film composer.

Born in Naples, Campania, Italy, to a family of itinerant Neapolitan musicians, he moved with his family to Porte de Choisy in France in 1922 following the rise of fascism in Italy. One of his neighbours was a young Django Reinhardt, with whose family he became close. He also put to music many poems from Prévert's Paroles with Joseph Kosma. He died in Paris from lung cancer.

Discography
 Jacques Prévert dit "paroles" (1954)
 6 jolis petits airs (1955)
 Henri Crolla et son Ensemble (Mon Homme) EP (1955)
 Henri Crolla et son Ensemble (There's a Small Hotel) (1955)
 Le Long des Rues (1957)
 C'est Pour Toi Que Je Joue (1957)
 Quatre classiques du jazz (1957)
 Chansons dans le sang with Jacques Prévert (1960) 
 Le Paris sentimental d'Henri Crolla (1962)
 Notre Ami Django (2001)
 Begin the Beguine (2002)
 Quand refleuriront les lilas blancs? (2002)

Filmography
 (1950) as a cameo guitarist
Champs Élysées (1953)
Enrico cuisinier (1954) also starring in it
L'Étrange Désir de monsieur Bard (1954) features his song Car je t'aime
 Gas-Oil (1955)
Les Bras de la Seine (1955)
À propos d'une rivière (1955)
Mon chien (1955)
Le Ciel par dessus le toit (1956)
Léon la lune (1956) in collaboration with André Hodeir
Naughty Girl (1956) in collaboration with René Denoncin and Hubert Rostaing
La Parisienne (1957) in collaboration with André Hodeir and Hubert Rostaing
Django Reinhardt (1957) as a performer guitarist
 Fugitive in Saigon (1957)
Péché de jeunesse (1958) with André Hodeir
 And Your Sister? (1958) with André Hodeir
Paris mange son pain (1958) with André Hodeir
Le vent se lève (1959) with André Hodeir
Les Motards (1959)
 (1959)
Black Orpheus (1959) as guitarist
The Golden Fish (1959)
The Restless and the Damned (1959) with André Hodeir
Come Dance with Me (1959) with André Hodeir
Photo souvenir (1960)
Love and the Frenchwoman (Le Divorce segment) (1960)
 (1960) with André Hodeir
 (1960) with José Toledo
 (1960)
 (1961) with André Hodeir
 (1961)
Le bonheur est pour demain (1962) with Georges Delerue
Le Tout pour le tout (1963) with Renato de Oliveira
World Without Sun (1964) with Serge Baudo and André Hodeir
La Faim du monde (1969)
Saint-Paul de Vence composed the song for Mouloudji with words from a poem by

Sources
 Les Ballades de Crolla by Norbert Gabriel and Sophie Tournel
 :fr:Henri Crolla

1920 births
1960 deaths
French jazz guitarists
French male guitarists
Italian jazz guitarists
Italian male guitarists
Musicians from Naples
20th-century classical composers
French film score composers
French people of Italian descent
French male film score composers
20th-century guitarists
20th-century French composers
20th-century French male musicians
French male jazz musicians
Italian emigrants to France